Stanley Harper (né Stanley Theodore Wisser; 2 September 1921 – 29 June 2016) was an American virtuoso classical harmonica artist, arranger, and composer. He died June 29, 2016, in a home for the elderly in New Jersey.  He raised the popularity of classical harmonica by influencing composers to write for the instrument and by transcribing serious classical works, himself.  Through his virtuosity, he widened the recognition of classical harmonica in solo, chamber, and major orchestral settings.

Career history 
Harper began his professional harmonica career in 1935, at age 14.  In 1941, he went professionally for a short while by the name Ted Stanley.  He went on to perform and record nationally on radio, television, record, theaters, and film until 2015. In the mid to late 1930s, Harper performed with The Harmonica Scamps and Three Harpers, both based in New York City. He apparently only began using the name Stan Harper after World War II. Over the years, he performed with other renown harmonica players and a range of entertainers and artists, including Eddie Shu (Shulman), Carl Reiner, Howard Morris, Hal David, Werner Klemperer, Sam Wanamaker, and Leon Kirchner.

Up until the death of Charley Leighton, Harper was a regular member of a harmonica jam session held every Tuesday at 3 PM at Charley Leighton's apartment in New York City.  In addition to Leighton, regulars included Charles Spranklin (Charles Edward Spranklin; born 1932), William Galison, Randy Weinstein, Stanley Silverstone, Gregoire Maret, Phil Caltabelotta, and Rob Paparozzi.

Selected discography

LPs and CDs

Audiocassettes 

"Stan Harper Plays Mozart and Farnon" (privately published)

Side A: Concerto for Clarinet K622 • W.A. Mozart • First and Second Movements • The Aeolian Orchestra - Dr. Anton Delbec, Conductor • Charles Leighton: Recording Engineer

Side B: 1) Concerto for Clarinet • W.A. Mozart - Third Movement with Orchestra; 2) Prelude and Dance for Harmonica • Robert Farnon • Stan Harper, Harmonica; Don Smith, Piano

Singles

Publications 
Stan Harper's Harmonica Repair Manual (For Chromatic and Diatonic) (undated)

Notable broadcast and live performances 
 Television – Arthur Godfrey's Talent Scouts, solo appearance, May 7, 1951
 Television – Today, hosted by Hugh Downs, solo appearance, November 24, 1963
 Convention for World Records, New York City, 1977 – Following a performance by Morris Samskin (1924–2000) performing on a 2-inch violin, the world's smallest, Harper performed on a 1-inch harmonica, also the world's smallest. The two performances were chronicled as world records by Ripley's Believe It or Not
 Carnegie Recital Hall, harmonica & piano, Helen Wheaton Benham (born 1941) (piano), Saturday, November 6, 1980, 2:30
 Smithsonian Institution, Washington, D.C., solo appearance, 1991, demonstrating his skills using 5 to 6 different sized harmonicas

Filmography 
 ...One Third of a Nation..., 1939, harmonica player (uncredited) (A clip is shown in "If You're Not in the Obit, Eat Breakfast". See below.)
 [Uncredited performances in bands appearing in movies from 1940s until the 1960s. He appeared in five or six movie shorts, one including “Pinky” Perelmuth (later known as the celebrated singer Jan Peerce (1904–1984)), who was a violinist then.]
 "Pocket Full of Soul: The Harmonica Documentary" 2013, Omni-Harmonic, LLC (http://pocketfullofsoulmovie.com)
 "If You're Not in the Obit, Eat Breakfast" (An HBO documentary film where 95-year-old comedy legend Carl Reiner tracks celebrated people in their '90s. Started airing on June 5, 2017. http://www.hbo.com/documentaries/if-youre-not-in-the-obit-eat-breakfast)

Harper's surname as a hamonica namesake 
Hering Harmonicas, hand maker of diatonic and chromatic harmonicas, located in Blumenau, Santa Catarina, Brazil, started producing in 2009 a popular model bearing Harper's name:  The Stan Harper Chromatic 56, a three-octave, 14-hole instrument with 56 brass reeds sealed by a pearwood body bolted to a hardwood comb with chrome-plated cover plates, mouthpiece and slide assembly. The Hering Harmonica Company worked with Stan to produce a 3.5 octave chromatic harmonica (14 holes). It is unique in that once can play classical music on it easily, since it starts with a “G” note; that unique element was Stan Harper’s idea.

Selected published music 
 "Baby Sitter Polka," music by Stan Harper, Dana Music Co., 115 W 45 St., New York, New York, © May 2, 1952
 "Mosquito Polka," music by Stan Harper, Dana Music Co. © April 28, 1952
 Composed the musical score for "And Now Miguel" (1966).

Popular culture 
 The Guinness Book of World Records, 1978 edition (p. 222), 1979 edition (p. 223), and the 1982 edition (p. 232)-and possibly also the years in between, show a photograph of Stan Harper playing the largest harmonic, the Hohner 48 Chord Harmonica, which, when separated, measures 4 feet long. it has 384 separate holes and can play in a total of 48 major, minor and diminished chords.

Family 
Stanley Theodore Wisser grew up in a Jewish home and was the youngest of six born to a Ukrainian-born American father, Abraham Wisser (né Konvisser) (1879-1955), and Moldovan-born American mother, Rose (née Kramer; 1885-1950) — his father was born in a village near Nizhyn, Ukraine, and his mother in Briceni, Moldova. His mother came from a family of cantors.

Harper had been a widower of Era Maria Tognoli (1919–2011), a 1940s opera soprano who, in 1959, founded the Metro Lyric Opera Company in Allenhurst, New Jersey, and for 52 years (until her death), directed it.  Harper and Tongoli were married March 17, 1964, in Asbury Park, New Jersey.

References

Notes

General references

 Publicity poster: Hohner National Harmonica Contest, University of Mississippi Library, Digital Collections, Blues Photograph Collection (undated; 1987?);

Inline citations

1921 births
2016 deaths
American harmonica players
Jersey Shore musicians
Musicians from Brooklyn